Bruce Kent (22 June 1929 – 8 June 2022) was a British Roman Catholic priest who became a political activist in the Campaign for Nuclear Disarmament, and held various leadership positions in the organisation.

Early life
Born on 22 June 1929 in Blackheath, Southeast London, Kent was the son of Molly (Marion) and Kenneth Kent. He was educated in Canada before attending Stonyhurst College. He served as an officer in the Royal Tank Regiment from 1947 to 1949, and read Jurisprudence at Brasenose College, Oxford from 1949 to 1952. In 1952 he began a six-year course studying for the priesthood at St Edmund's seminary in Ware, Hertfordshire.

Priesthood
In 1958, Kent was ordained as a Roman Catholic priest for the Diocese of Westminster and between 1958 and 1987 served in several London parishes, latterly becoming secretary to Cardinal John Heenan. Between 1966 and 1974 he was the Catholic chaplain to the University of London. He was chairman of the charity War on Want from 1974 to 1976.

In 1987, Kent retired from active ministry. In 1992, he was a candidate for the Labour Party in the constituency of Oxford West and Abingdon, where he came third. Had he been elected, he would at the time have been prevented, as an ordained priest, from taking his seat in the House of Commons. Sitting Member of Parliament and Conservative minister John Patten, also a Catholic, retained his seat.

Activism
In 1960, Kent joined the Christian Campaign for Nuclear Disarmament, a specialist section of the Campaign for Nuclear Disarmament (CND).  He was CND's general secretary from 1980 to 1985 and its chair from 1987 to 1990, and later held the honorary title of vice-president. In the 1980s he led resistance to the deployment of the BGM-109G Ground Launched Cruise Missile at RAF Greenham Common.

From 1985 to 1992, Kent succeeded Seán MacBride as president of the International Peace Bureau.  In 1997, he took part in the Musa Anter peace train to Diyarbakır, which aimed for a solution for the Kurdish-Turkish conflict. In a ceremony held on 19 October 2019, Kent was honoured with its MacBride Peace Prize. 

Kent was a patron of the Palestine Solidarity Campaign.

In April 2021 the Archbishop of Canterbury Justin Welby awarded the Lambeth Cross for Ecumenism jointly to Kent and to his wife Valerie Flessati "for exceptional, tireless and lifelong dedication to the Christian ecumenical search for peace, both individually and together."

Among his heroes was Franz Jägerstätter, the Austrian farmer who was executed in 1943 for refusing to fight in Hitler's army. As recently as 15 May 2022, Kent took part in the annual ceremony in Tavistock Square, London, to honour conscientious objectors throughout the world.

Personal life and death
Kent married Valerie Flessati on 4 July 1988 and lived in Harringay, North London.

Kent died on 8 June 2022, at home, two weeks before his 93rd birthday. At the time of his death Bruce was a Vice-President of CND, a Vice-President of Pax Christi, and Emeritus President of the Movement for the Abolition of War.

See also
 List of peace activists
 Biography on personal website

References

External links
Bruce Kent website
National Portrait Gallery Images of Bruce Kent
Interview about CND for the WGBH series, "War and Peace in the Nuclear Age"
"My Favourite Books", Socialist Review Issue 191, 1995
Articles written by Kent in the New Statesman
"The myths of the arms trade", The Tablet
"The Abolition of War: The Politics of Realistic Utopianism", Disarmament Diplomacy

1929 births
2022 deaths
People from Blackheath, London
20th-century British Roman Catholic priests
Alumni of Brasenose College, Oxford
British anti–nuclear weapons activists
British anti-war activists
Campaign for Nuclear Disarmament activists
Labour Party (UK) parliamentary candidates
Laicized Roman Catholic priests
People educated at Stonyhurst College
People from Harringay
Royal Tank Regiment officers